Jonathan 'Jonny' David Dymond (born 15 February 1970 in Merton, London<ref>'Births, Marriages & Deaths, Index of England & Wales confirms name and birthdate and lists birthplace as Merton, London. Publisher: General Registry Office. Retrieved: 5 February 2023.</ref>) is a British journalist. He is currently a Royal Correspondent for BBC News, having previously been the BBC's Washington Correspondent, Europe Correspondent (based in Brussels), and Middle East Correspondent (based in Istanbul).

Dymond is also a presenter for BBC Radio 4 news programmes including The World at One and Broadcasting House, and the BBC World Service's The World This Week and World Questions.

Education
From 1983—1987, Dymond was educated at St Paul's School, an independent school for boys, in the London district of Barnes. From 1988—1991, he studied Politics at Durham University, and in 1993 completed an MSc in Public Administration and Public Policy at the London School of Economics.

Career
Dymond joined the BBC in 1994 as a researcher and later became a producer on Newsnight''. Following this he worked as a reporter, first covering British politics for the BBC World Service and BBC World Service Television, then in 2000 moving to Washington DC. He covered 9/11 from DC, then went to Istanbul to cover Turkey and the Middle East between 2001 and 2005.

After some years as a foreign correspondent in Brussels, Dymond became a royal correspondent in 2017. Interviewed for the November 2019 edition of Town and Country, Dymond was critical of Prince Andrew for agreeing to be interviewed by Emily Maitlis about the controversy over his friendship with the American billionaire and convicted sex offender Jeffrey Epstein, suggesting it was a 'fantasy' that Prince Andrew could have reversed public opinion in one 40 minute interview. He told the same magazine that Prince Harry was rude to members of the press during a royal tour of Australia, New Zealand, and some Pacific Islands in 2018, but declined to go into details about what Prince Harry had said to them.

Personal
In 2008 Dymond was fined £230 for possession of cannabis, after a search at an airport in Vilnius found two grams of the drug among his clothes. Dymond admitted to purchasing cannabis at a nightclub, but claimed he packed it into his suitcase inadvertently.

See also
 List of Durham University people
 List of Old Paulines

References

Living people
1970 births
Alumni of the College of St Hild and St Bede, Durham
Alumni of the London School of Economics
BBC newsreaders and journalists
People educated at St Paul's School, London
Royal correspondents